Percy Brooke (12 May 1893 – 1971) was an English footballer who played in the Football League for Aberdare Athletic, Accrington Stanley, Stoke City and Swindon Town.

Career
Brooke's career began with his local side Kidsgrove Wellington, from whom he joined Stoke City, playing 11 times in league matches for Stoke in the 1919–20 and 1920–21 seasons. He left Stoke to join Aberdare Athletic, playing Aberdare's side in their first ever season in league football. He went on to make 123 league appearances for Aberdare before joining Swindon Town in 1926, making his Swindon debut in September 1926 in a 2–1 win at home to Bournemouth & Boscombe Athletic. He then dropped out of the side and only returned in April 1927 when he played in a 3–2 home win over his former side Aberdare (one of Aberdare's last games as a league side) and a 4–4 draw away to Gillingham. Brooke played twice for Accrington Stanley the following season before retiring from football.

Career statistics
Source:

References

1893 births
1971 deaths
People from Kidsgrove
English footballers
Stoke City F.C. players
Aberdare Athletic F.C. players
Swindon Town F.C. players
Accrington Stanley F.C. (1891) players
English Football League players
Association football fullbacks
Whitchurch F.C. players
Bromsgrove Rovers F.C. players